Kazimierz Zygfryd Barburski (7 August 1942 – 26 May 2016) was a Polish fencer. He won a bronze medal in the team épée event at the 1968 Summer Olympics.

References

1942 births
2016 deaths
Polish male fencers
Olympic fencers of Poland
Fencers at the 1968 Summer Olympics
Fencers at the 1972 Summer Olympics
Olympic bronze medalists for Poland
Olympic medalists in fencing
Sportspeople from Łódź
Medalists at the 1968 Summer Olympics
21st-century Polish people
20th-century Polish people